Yaroslav Alexandrovych Yevdokimov, born 22 November 1946) is a baritone, Honored Artist of the Russian Federation, and People's Artist of the Belarus.

Honoured ranks
 17 April 1980 – According to the Decree of the Presidium of the Supreme Soviet of the Byelorussian Soviet Socialist Republic, he was given the honorary title   Honored Artist of the Byelorussian SSR;
 13 July 1987 – According to the Decree of the Presidium of the Supreme Soviet of the Byelorussian Soviet Socialist Republic, he was given the honorary title  People's Artist of the BSSR;
 15 February 2006 – Presidential Decree awarded him the honorary title  Meritorious Artist. 
 Yaroslav Yevdokimov was honored by the unique website  New Ukraine.

Discography
 1988 – Everything will come true;
 1994 – Don’t tear the shirt – songs by V.Okorokova (CD);
 2002 – Dreamer – songs by A.Morozova (CD);
 2002 –  Kiss your palm (CD);
 2006 – Beyond the White River (CD);
 2008 – Yaroslav  Yevdokimov and the band Sladka Yagoda. The best Ukrainian and Cossack’s songs (CD);
 2012 – Return to autumn (CD)

References

Sources
 Беларуская энцыклапедыя. Т. 6. – Мн., 1998. Энцыклапедыя літаратуры і мастацтва Беларусі. Т. 2. – Мн., 1985.
 Encykłapiedyja biełaruskaj papularnaj muzyki. Mińsk: Zmicier Kołas, 2008, s. 368. . (biał.)

External links 

  Золотий Фонд української естради

1946 births
Living people
Musicians from Rivne
Ukrainian people of Russian descent
Baritones
Soviet male singers
20th-century Russian male singers
20th-century Russian singers
20th-century Belarusian male singers
20th-century Ukrainian male singers
21st-century Ukrainian male singers
Honored Artists of the Russian Federation